Javier Francisco Ovando (born 1977), is a Honduran man who became a central figure in the LAPD Rampart scandal when he was shot and framed by corrupt Rampart officers Rafael Pérez and Nino Durden. Ovando is an immigrant to the United States and a former member of the powerful 18th Street gang. He is the recipient of the largest police misconduct settlement in Los Angeles history.

Officers Durden and Pérez entered then 19-year-old Ovando's apartment on October 12, 1996, and shot him, leaving him paralyzed. According to the officers' testimony later, they planted a gun on him and reported that the unarmed Ovando had fired on them first. Ovando, paralyzed from the waist down, was sentenced to 23 years in prison based on the officers' testimony.

Release and settlement
On September 16, 1999, Ovando was released from prison after Perez recanted his earlier testimony. The District Attorney's office filed a writ of habeas corpus overturning Ovando's conviction. Ovando had spent two-and-a-half years incarcerated.

On November 21, 2000, Ovando received a $15 million settlement, the largest police misconduct settlement in Los Angeles history.

References

1977 births
Date of birth missing (living people)
Gang members
Honduran drug traffickers
Honduran emigrants to the United States
Criminals from Los Angeles
Place of birth missing (living people)
People with paraplegia
Police misconduct in the United States
Shooting survivors
Living people
Victims of police brutality in the United States